The year 1978 in film involved some significant events.

Highest-grossing films (U.S.)

The top ten 1978 released films by box office gross in the United States and Canada are as follows:

Events
 February 6 – David Begelman resigns as president of Columbia Pictures.
 March 1 – Charlie Chaplin's coffin is stolen from a Swiss cemetery three months after burial. After recovery a few weeks later, the casket is sealed in a concrete vault prior to reburial.
 March – Leigh Brackett completes the first draft for The Empire Strikes Back, but dies only two weeks later.
 June – Daniel Melnick becomes head of Columbia Pictures after the David Begelman scandal.
 June 4 – Grease, starring John Travolta and Olivia Newton-John, has its world premiere at Grauman's Chinese Theatre in Hollywood. It becomes the highest-grossing musical ever and Paramount Pictures' highest-grossing film.
 July 20 – Alan Hirschfield is fired as president and CEO of Columbia Pictures. He is replaced by Francis T. Vincent.
 August – Production begins on Star Trek: The Motion Picture.
 September – George Lucas purchases Bulltail Ranch, on Lucas Valley Road, for the development of Skywalker Ranch.
 October 25 – Halloween is released.
 November 17 – Star Wars Holiday Special airs on CBS. The special gives fans their first glimpse of Boba Fett, a character from the upcoming sequel. But he wasn’t enough for the special not to get negative reviews upon airing.
 December 10 – Superman premieres at the Kennedy Centre in Washington, D.C. and has a European Royal Charity Premiere at the Empire, Leicester Square in London three days later in the presence of HM Queen Elizabeth II and Prince Andrew.

Awards 

Palme d'Or (Cannes Film Festival):
The Tree of Wooden Clogs (L'Albero degli zoccoli), directed by Ermanno Olmi, Italy

Golden Bear (Berlin Film Festival):
Trout (Las Truchas), directed by José Luis García Sánchez, Spain
What Max Said (Las Palabras de Max), directed by Emilio Martínez-Lázaro, Spain

1978 Wide-release films

January–March

April–June

July–September

October–December

Notable films released in 1978
U.S.A. unless stated

#
The 36th Chamber of Shaolin (Shao Lin san shi liu fang), starring Gordon Liu – (Hong Kong)

A
Almost Summer, directed by Martin Davidson, starring Bruno Kirby and Lee Purcell
American Boy: A Profile of Steven Prince, directed by Martin Scorsese (documentary)
American Hot Wax, a biopic of Alan Freed, starring Tim McIntire, Fran Drescher, Laraine Newman, Jay Leno
L'argent des autres (Other People's Money), starring Jean-Louis Trintignant and Catherine Deneuve – (France)
The Astral Factor, starring Robert Foxworth and Stefanie Powers
Autumn Sonata (Höstsonaten), directed by Ingmar Bergman, starring Ingrid Bergman and Liv Ullmann – (Sweden)
Avalanche, starring Rock Hudson, Robert Forster, Mia Farrow

B
The Bad News Bears Go to Japan, starring Tony Curtis and Jackie Earle Haley
Bandits vs. Samurai Squadron (Kumokiri Nizaemon) – (Japan)
Battlestar Galactica (Canada and most European countries only; released in U.S. theatres the following year)
The Betsy, starring Laurence Olivier, Robert Duvall, Tommy Lee Jones, Katharine Ross, Kathleen Beller, Lesley-Anne Down
The Big Fix, starring Richard Dreyfuss, Susan Anspach, F. Murray Abraham, John Lithgow
The Big Sleep, starring Robert Mitchum, Sarah Miles, Oliver Reed, Richard Boone, Candy Clark, Joan Collins, James Stewart – (U.K.)
Big Wednesday, directed by John Milius, starring Jan-Michael Vincent, William Katt, Gary Busey
Bloodbrothers, starring Richard Gere and Paul Sorvino
Blue Collar, directed by Paul Schrader, starring Richard Pryor, Yaphet Kotto, Harvey Keitel
Born Again, starring Dean Jones and Anne Francis
The Boys from Brazil, directed by Franklin J. Schaffner, starring Gregory Peck, Laurence Olivier, James Mason – (U.K./U.S.)
The Boys in Company C, starring Stan Shaw, Andrew Stevens and Craig Wasson
The Brink's Job, directed by William Friedkin, starring Peter Falk, Gena Rowlands, Peter Boyle, Paul Sorvino, Warren Oates
The Buddy Holly Story, starring Gary Busey, Don Stroud and Charles Martin Smith
Bye Bye Monkey (Rêve de singe / Ciao maschio), starring Gérard Depardieu and Marcello Mastroianni – (France/Italy)

C
La Cage aux Folles, directed by Édouard Molinaro, starring Ugo Tognazzi and Michel Serrault – (France/Italy)
California Suite, starring Alan Alda, Jane Fonda, Michael Caine, Maggie Smith, Richard Pryor, Bill Cosby, Elaine May, Walter Matthau
Capricorn One, directed by Peter Hyams, starring Elliott Gould, James Brolin, O. J. Simpson, Sam Waterston, Hal Holbrook, Brenda Vaccaro
Caravans, starring Anthony Quinn, Jennifer O'Neill, Michael Sarrazin
Casey's Shadow, starring Walter Matthau, Alexis Smith, Robert Webber
The Cat from Outer Space, starring Ken Berry and Sandy Duncan
Centennial, TV miniseries, starring Raymond Burr, Richard Chamberlain, Richard Crenna, Andy Griffith, David Janssen, Alex Karras
La chambre verte (The Green Room), directed by and starring François Truffaut – (France)
The Chant of Jimmie Blacksmith, directed by Fred Schepisi – (Australia)
The Cheap Detective, starring Peter Falk, Ann-Margret, Marsha Mason, Sid Caesar
China 9, Liberty 37 (Amore, piombo e furore), starring Fabio Testi, Jenny Agutter, Warren Oates – (Italy/Spain)
The Class of Miss MacMichael, starring Glenda Jackson, Oliver Reed, Michael Murphy – (U.K.)
Closed Circuit (Circuito chiuso) – (Italy)
Coma, directed by Michael Crichton, starring Geneviève Bujold, Michael Douglas, Richard Widmark
Comes a Horseman, directed by Alan J. Pakula, starring Jane Fonda, James Caan, Jason Robards
Coming Home, directed by Hal Ashby, starring Jane Fonda, Jon Voight, Bruce Dern, Penelope Milford
Convoy, directed by Sam Peckinpah, starring Kris Kristofferson, Ali MacGraw and Ernest Borgnine
Corvette Summer, starring Mark Hamill
Cosi' come sei (aka Stay As You Are) starring Marcello Mastroianni and Nastassja Kinski – (Italy)
Crippled Avengers (Can que), directed by Chang Cheh – (Hong Kong)

D
The Dain Curse, mini-series for TV, starring James Coburn and Jean Simmons
Damien: Omen II, starring William Holden and Lee Grant
d'Artagnan and Three Musketeers – (U.S.S.R.)
Dawn of the Dead, directed by George A. Romero – (U.S./Italy)
Days of Heaven, directed by Terrence Malick, starring Richard Gere, Sam Shepard, Brooke Adams
Death on the Nile, directed by John Guillermin, starring Peter Ustinov, David Niven, Bette Davis, Maggie Smith, Angela Lansbury, Olivia Hussey, Mia Farrow – (U.K.)
Deathsport, starring David Carradine
Debbie Does Dallas, pornographic comedy
The Deer Hunter, directed by Michael Cimino, starring Robert De Niro, John Cazale, John Savage, Christopher Walken, Meryl Streep
The Demon (Kichiku) – (Japan)
A Different Story, starring Meg Foster, Perry King, Valerie Curtin
El diputado (The Deputy) – (Spain)
Don, starring Amitabh Bachchan – (India)
A Dream of Passion (Kravgi gynaikon), directed by Jules Dassin, starring Melina Mercouri and Ellen Burstyn – (Greece)
The Driver, directed by Walter Hill, starring Ryan O'Neal, Bruce Dern, Isabelle Adjani, Ronee Blakley
Drunken Master (Jui kuen), starring Jackie Chan – (Hong Kong)

E
Ecce bombo, directed by and starring Nanni Moretti – (Italy)
Empire of Passion (Ai no Bōrei), directed by Nagisa Oshima – (Japan)
The End, directed by and starring Burt Reynolds, with Dom DeLuise, Joanne Woodward, Pat O'Brien, Myrna Loy, Sally Field
An Enemy of the People, starring Steve McQueen
Enter the Fat Dragon (Fei Lung gwoh gong), starring Sammo Hung – (Hong Kong)
Every Which Way but Loose, directed by James Fargo, starring Clint Eastwood, Sondra Locke, Geoffrey Lewis
Eyes of Laura Mars, directed by Irvin Kershner, starring Faye Dunaway and Tommy Lee Jones

F
F.I.S.T., directed by Norman Jewison, starring Sylvester Stallone, Melinda Dillon, Rod Steiger
FM, starring Cleavon Little and Eileen Brennan
Fedora, directed by Billy Wilder, starring William Holden and Marthe Keller
Fingers, directed by James Toback, starring Harvey Keitel
Five Deadly Venoms
Force 10 from Navarone, starring Robert Shaw, Edward Fox, Harrison Ford – (U.K.)
Foul Play, directed by Colin Higgins, starring Goldie Hawn, Chevy Chase, Dudley Moore and Billy Barty
The Fury, directed by Brian De Palma, starring Kirk Douglas, John Cassavetes, Carrie Snodgress, Andrew Stevens, Amy Irving

G
Gates of Heaven, a documentary film
Germany in Autumn (Deutschland im Herbst) – (West Germany)
Get Out Your Handkerchiefs (Preparez vos mouchoirs), directed by Bertrand Blier – (France)
Girlfriends, directed by Claudia Weill, starring Melanie Mayron – Sundance Grand Jury Prize winner
Go Tell the Spartans, starring Burt Lancaster
Gray Lady Down, starring Charlton Heston, David Carradine, Stacy Keach, Ronny Cox, Ned Beatty
Grease, directed by Randal Kleiser, starring John Travolta, Olivia Newton-John, Jeff Conaway, Stockard Channing, Sid Caesar, Eve Arden
The Great Bank Hoax, directed by Joseph Jacoby, starring Richard Basehart, Ned Beatty, Burgess Meredith, Michael Murphy, Paul Sand, Charlene Dallas
The Greek Tycoon, directed by J. Lee Thompson, starring Anthony Quinn and Jacqueline Bisset

H
Halloween, directed by John Carpenter, starring Jamie Lee Curtis and Donald Pleasence
Harper Valley PTA, starring Barbara Eden
Heaven Can Wait, directed by Buck Henry and Warren Beatty, starring Beatty, Julie Christie, Charles Grodin, Dyan Cannon, Jack Warden, James Mason
The Herd (Sürü) – (Turkey)
High-Ballin', starring Peter Fonda, Michael Ironside, Helen Shaver, Jerry Reed
Holocaust, TV miniseries, starring Meryl Streep, James Woods, Michael Moriarty, Tovah Feldshuh, Fritz Weaver, Ian Holm
Hooper, directed by Hal Needham, starring Burt Reynolds, Sally Field, Jan-Michael Vincent, Robert Klein, Brian Keith
Hot Lead and Cold Feet, directed by Robert Butler, starring Jim Dale, Karen Valentine, Don Knotts
House Calls, directed by Howard Zieff, starring Walter Matthau, Glenda Jackson, Richard Benjamin, Art Carney
A Hunting Accident (Moy laskovyy i nezhnyy zver) – (U.S.S.R.)

I
I Wanna Hold Your Hand, directed by Robert Zemeckis, starring Nancy Allen, Marc McClure, Bobby Di Cicco
Ice Castles, directed by Donald Wrye, starring Lynn-Holly Johnson and Robby Benson
In a Year of 13 Moons (In einem Jahr mit 13 Monden), directed by Rainer Werner Fassbinder – (West Germany)
In Praise of Older Women, starring Tom Berenger, Karen Black, Helen Shaver – (Canada)
Interiors, directed by Woody Allen, starring Geraldine Page, Diane Keaton, E. G. Marshall, Mary Beth Hurt, Maureen Stapleton
International Velvet, starring Tatum O'Neal, Nanette Newman and Anthony Hopkins
Invasion of the Body Snatchers, remake of 1956 movie, directed by Philip Kaufman, starring Donald Sutherland, Brooke Adams, Jeff Goldblum

J
Jaws 2, directed by Jeannot Szwarc, starring Roy Scheider and Lorraine Gary

K
Killer of Sheep, directed by Charles Burnett
King of the Gypsies, starring Eric Roberts, Sterling Hayden, Judd Hirsch, Shelley Winters, Brooke Shields
Kondura (The Boon), directed by Shyam Benegal – (India-Bollywood/Telugu)

L
Lady on the Bus (A Dama do Lotação), starring Sônia Braga – (Brazil)
The Left-Handed Woman (Die linkshändige Frau) – (West Germany)
The Last Waltz, directed by Martin Scorsese, featuring The Band, Van Morrison, Neil Young, Bob Dylan
Long Weekend, starring John Hargreaves – (Australia)
The Lord of the Rings, animated film by Ralph Bakshi, with voices of William Squire, John Hurt, Anthony Daniels

M
Magic, directed by Richard Attenborough, starring Anthony Hopkins, Ann-Margret, Burgess Meredith, Ed Lauter
De Mantel der Liefde (The Mantle of Love) – (Netherlands)
Mean Dog Blues, starring Gregg Henry, Kay Lenz, Tina Louise and George Kennedy
The Medusa Touch, starring Richard Burton, Lino Ventura and Lee Remick – (U.K.)
Midnight Express, directed by Alan Parker, starring Brad Davis, Randy Quaid, John Hurt – (U.K./U.S.)
Moment by Moment, directed by Jane Wagner, starring John Travolta and Lily Tomlin
Movie Movie, directed by Stanley Donen, starring George C. Scott, Harry Hamlin, Barry Bostwick, Trish Van Devere, Red Buttons, Art Carney
Muqaddar Ka Sikandar (Conqueror of Destiny), starring Amitabh Bachchan – (India)

N
National Lampoon's Animal House, directed by John Landis, starring John Belushi, Tim Matheson, Peter Riegert, Tom Hulce, Karen Allen, John Vernon
Newsfront, directed by Phillip Noyce, starring Wendy Hughes and Bryan Brown – (Australia)
A Night Full of Rain (Una notte piena di pioggia), directed by Lina Wertmüller, starring Giancarlo Giannini and Candice Bergen – (Italy/U.S.)
The Night the Prowler, directed by Jim Sharman – (Australia)

O
Occupation in 26 Pictures (Okupacija u 26 slika) – (Yugoslavia)
Oliver's Story, directed by John Korty, starring Ryan O'Neal and Candice Bergen 
The One and Only, directed by Carl Reiner, starring Henry Winkler and Kim Darby
Orchestra Rehearsal (Prova d'orchestra), directed by Federico Fellini – (Italy)

P
Paradise Alley, directed by and starring Sylvester Stallone, with Armand Assante and Anne Archer
Passion Flower Hotel (Leidenschaftliche Blümchen), starring Nastassja Kinski – (West Germany)
Perceval le Gallois (Percival the Gaul), directed by Éric Rohmer – (France)
Piranha, directed by Joe Dante, starring Bradford Dillman, Heather Menzies, Kevin McCarthy
The Place Without Limits (El lugar sin límites) – (Mexico)
Pretty Baby, directed by Louis Malle, starring Keith Carradine, Susan Sarandon, Brooke Shields
The Prophet, the Gold and the Transylvanians (Profetul, aurul si Ardelenii) – (Romania)
Pugachev – (U.S.S.R.)

R
Rabbit Test, directed by Joan Rivers, starring Billy Crystal
Remember My Name, starring Geraldine Chaplin and Anthony Perkins
Renaldo and Clara, directed by and starring Bob Dylan
Return from Witch Mountain, starring Bette Davis and Christopher Lee
Revenge of the Pink Panther, starring Peter Sellers, Herbert Lom and Dyan Cannon – (U.K./U.S.)
Rhinegold – (West Germany)
Ringing Bell (Chirin no Suzu), an anime film – (Japan)
Rockers, starring Burning Spear, Gregory Isaacs and Big Youth – (Jamaica)

S
The Sailor's Return, starring Tom Bell – (U.K.)
Same Time Next Year, starring Alan Alda and Ellen Burstyn
The Second Awakening of Christa Klages, directed by Margarethe von Trotta – (West Germany)
Sextette, starring Mae West, Timothy Dalton, Dom DeLuise, Ringo Starr, Keith Moon, George Hamilton, Alice Cooper
Sgt. Pepper's Lonely Hearts Club Band, starring Peter Frampton, Steve Martin and the Bee Gees with music by The Beatles
Shogun's Samurai (Yagu ichizoku no inbō), starring Sonny Chiba – (Japan)
The Shout, directed by Jerzy Skolimowski, starring Alan Bates, John Hurt and Susannah York – (U.K.)
The Silent Partner, directed by Daryl Duke, starring Elliott Gould, Christopher Plummer, Susannah York
Slow Dancing in the Big City, directed by John G. Avildsen, starring Paul Sorvino
The Small One
Snake in the Eagle's Shadow (Shé xíng diāo shǒu), starring Jackie Chan – (Hong Kong)
Somebody Killed Her Husband, starring Farrah Fawcett and Jeff Bridges
Stevie, starring Glenda Jackson and Trevor Howard – (U.K.)
Straight Time, directed by Ulu Grosbard, starring Dustin Hoffman, Theresa Russell, Harry Dean Stanton, Gary Busey
The Stud, starring Joan Collins – (U.K.)
Superman, directed by Richard Donner, starring Christopher Reeve, Marlon Brando, Gene Hackman, Margot Kidder, Valerie Perrine, Ned Beatty, Glenn Ford
The Swarm, starring Michael Caine, Katharine Ross, Richard Widmark, Henry Fonda, Fred MacMurray, Olivia de Havilland, Ben Johnson, Lee Grant
The Swissmakers (Die Schweizermacher) – (Switzerland)

T
Thank God It's Friday, starring Debra Winger, Donna Summer, Jeff Goldblum
Three from Prostokvashino (Troye iz Prostokvashino) – (U.S.S.R.)
Toplo (Heat) – (Bulgaria)
The Tree of Wooden Clogs (L'Albero degli zoccoli), directed by Ermanno Olmi – (Italy) – Palme d'Or winner
Trishul, starring Sanjeev Kumar and Amitabh Bachchan – (India)
Las truchas (The Trout) – (Spain) – Golden Bear winner
Twelve Days of Christmas - Walt Disney Productions' Only Adult-animated Movie
Two Solitudes, starring Jean-Pierre Aumont and Stacy Keach – (Canada)

U
Uncle Joe Shannon, starring Burt Young
An Unmarried Woman, directed by Paul Mazursky, starring Jill Clayburgh, Alan Bates, Michael Murphy
Up in Smoke, starring Cheech Marin and Tommy Chong

V
Violette Nozière, directed by Claude Chabrol, starring Isabelle Huppert and Stéphane Audran – (France)

W
Ward Six (Paviljon VI) – (Yugoslavia)
Warriors Two (Zan xian sheng yu zhao qian Hua), starring Bryan Leung and Sammo Hung – (Hong Kong)
The Water Babies, directed by Lionel Jeffries, starring James Mason, Bernard Cribbins, Billie Whitelaw – (U.K./Poland)
Watership Down, animated film directed by Martin Rosen, with the voices of John Hurt and Richard Briers – (U.K.)
A Wedding, directed by Robert Altman, starring Desi Arnaz, Jr., Carol Burnett, Geraldine Chaplin, Lauren Hutton, Paul Dooley, Mia Farrow
Who Is Killing the Great Chefs of Europe?, starring George Segal and Jacqueline Bisset – (West Germany/U.S.)
Who'll Stop the Rain, directed by Karel Reisz, starring Nick Nolte and Tuesday Weld
The Wild Geese, starring Richard Burton, Roger Moore, Richard Harris – (U.K.)
Without Anesthesia (Bez znieczulenia), directed by Andrzej Wajda – (Poland)
The Wiz, directed by Sidney Lumet, starring Diana Ross, Michael Jackson, Nipsey Russell
Wolf Lake, directed by Burt Kennedy, starring Rod Steiger

Y
You Are Not Alone (Du er ikke alene) – (Denmark)

Births
 January 1 – Christian Tessier, Canadian actor
 January 2
Raghda Khateb, Syrian voice actress
Megumi Toyoguchi, Japanese voice actress
 January 3 – Kimberley Locke, American singer-songwriter and model
 January 5
Clarine Harp, American voice actress
January Jones, American actress and model
America Olivo, American actress and singer
 January 8 – Scott Whyte, American actor
 January 9 – A. J. McLean, American musician, singer, dancer, actor, and entertainer
 January 10 – Antonio Cupo, Canadian film and television actor
 January 15  
 Eddie Cahill, American actor
 Jamie Clayton, actress, model
 January 17
Pampita, Argentine model, actress, television personality
Takatoshi Kaneko, Japanese actor
Pater Sparrow, Hungarian actor, filmmaker
Ricky Wilson, English actor, singer
 January 20 – Omar Sy, French actor
 January 24
Mark Hildreth, Canadian actor, voice actor
Kristen Schaal, American actress, comedian and writer
 January 27 – Jake Pavelka, American pilot, television personality
 January 28 – Stephen Farrelly, Irish actor, professional wrestler
 February 7 – Ashton Kutcher, American actor
 February 9 – A. J. Buckley, Canadian actor
 February 10 - Don Omar, Puerto Rican singer, rapper and actor
 February 12 – 
Paul Anderson, British actor
Gethin Jones, Welsh television presenter
 February 14 – Danai Gurira, actress, playwright
 February 17
Ashton Holmes, American actor
Rory Kinnear, English actor and playwright
 February 20
Jay Hernandez, American actor
Julia Jentsch, German actress
 February 23 – Kris Lemche, Canadian actor
 February 24 – Nicole Lyn, Canadian actress
 February 28 - Geoffrey Arend, American actor
 March 1 – Jensen Ackles, American actor
 March 3 – Aarti Mann, Indian-American actress
 March 5 – Kimberly McCullough, American actress, dancer, director
 March 8 – Nick Zano, American actor
 March 9 - Katherine Parkinson, English actress
 March 16 - Sophie Hunter, English actress and singer
 March 17 - Patrick Seitz, American voice actor
 March 21 
Kevin Federline, American rapper, DJ, actor, television personality, professional wrestler, and fashion model
Rani Mukerji, Indian actress
 March 23 – Nicholle Tom and David Tom, American actress and actor
 March 24 - Amanda Brugel, Canadian actress
 March 31 - Daniel Mays, English actor
 April 1 – Anamaria Marinca, Romanian actress
 April 2 – Deon Richmond, American actor
 April 3 – Matthew Goode, English actor
 April 6 - Lauren Ridloff, deaf American actress
 April 7  
Duncan James, English actor, television presenter and singer
Scott McGillivray, Canadian television host
 April 8 - Paola Núñez, Mexican actress and producer
 April 12 – Riley Smith, American actor
 April 13 – Kyle Howard, American actor
 April 16 – Lara Dutta, Indian actress 
 April 17 – Ido Mosseri, Israeli actor, singer and musician
 April 19  
James Franco, American actor
Joanna Gaines, American designer, businesswoman, entrepreneur, television personality
 April 20
Matt Austin, Canadian actor
Clayne Crawford, American actor
 April 23 – Ian Brennan, American writer, actor, producer
 April 26  
 Stana Katic, Canadian-American actress, producer
 Pablo Schreiber, Canadian actor
 April 28  
Nate Richert, American actor, musician
Drew Scott, Canadian actor, realtor, and entrepreneur
Jonathan Scott, Canadian reality television personality, contractor, illusionist, and television and film producer
 April 29 – Tyler Labine, Canadian actor
 April 30 – Sandra Huller, German actress
 May 1 – James Badge Dale, American actor
 May 2 - Kumail Nanjiani, Pakistani-American comedian, actor and screenwriter
 May 4 – Daisuke Ono, Japanese voice actor and singer
 May 5 – Santiago Cabrera, Venezuelan-born Chilean actor
 May 8  
Matthew Davis, American actor
Ana Maria Lombo, American musician and television personality
Josie Maran, American model, actress, and entrepreneur
 May 9 – Daniel Franzese, American actor, comedian and activist 
 May 10 – Kenan Thompson, American actor, comedian
 May 11 – Warren Brown, English actor and former professional Thai boxer
 May 12
Aaron Abrams, Canadian actor, writer
Malin Åkerman, Swedish-Canadian actress
Jason Biggs, American actor
 May 15
Caroline Dhavernas, Canadian actress
David Krumholtz, American actor
 May 16 – Jim Sturgess, English actor
 May 17 - Gabriel Hogan, Canadian-born American actor
 May 18 – Chad Donella, Canadian actor
 May 21 – Chris Santos, American actor
 May 22 – Ginnifer Goodwin, American actress
 May 24 – Bryan Greenberg, American actor
 May 25 – Brian Urlacher, former American football linebacker
 May 26 – Laurence Fox, English actor, singer-songwriter, and guitarist
 May 28 – Jake Johnson, actor, comedian
 May 29 – Adam Rickitt, English actor, singer and model
 June 2
Dominic Cooper, English actor
Nikki Cox, American actress
Justin Long, American actor
 June 4
Josh McDermitt, American film and television actor and comedian
Robin Lord Taylor, American actor
 June 5
Nick Kroll, American actor, comedian, writer and producer
Jeff Schroeder, American television and online talk show host
 June 6 - Judith Barsi, American child actress (d. 1988)
 June 7 
Bill Hader, American actor, comedian
Anna Torv, Australian actress
 June 8 – Maria Menounos, American actress
 June 9 – Michaela Conlin, American actress
 June 10
 DJ Qualls, American actor
 Shane West, American actor
 June 11 – Joshua Jackson, Canadian actor
 June 12 - Timothy Simons, American actor and comedian
 June 13 – Ethan Embry, American actor
 June 14 - Diablo Cody, Canadian writer
 June 16 – Daniel Brühl, German actor
 June 18 – Tara Platt, American voice actress
 June 19
Mía Maestro, Argentine actress and singer-songwriter
Zoe Saldana, American actress
 June 20 – Quinton Jackson, American mixed martial artist, actor and former professional wrestler
 June 21 – Erica Durance, Canadian actress
 June 27 – Courtney Ford, actress
 June 28 – Ha Ji-won, South Korean actress
 June 29 – 
Luke Kirby, Canadian actor
Nicole Scherzinger, American singer, songwriter, dancer, actress and television personality
 July 2 – Owain Yeoman, Welsh actor
 July 3 – Ian Anthony Dale, American actor
 July 4
Andrea Gabriel, American actress
Becki Newton, American actress
 July 6
Adam Busch, American actor, film director and singer
Tia Mowry and Tamera Mowry, American actresses
 July 8 – Rachael Lillis, American voice actress
 July 9 – Kyle Davis, American actor
 July 11 
Dustin Demri-Burns, English actor, comedian, and writer
Thomas Stone, Hungarian pornographic actor
 July 12
 Topher Grace, American actor
 Michelle Rodriguez, American actress
 July 15 – Greg Sestero, American actor, writer
 July 17 – R. J. Williams, American actor, television host, CEO of Young Hollywood
 July 20 
Charlie Korsmo, American former child actor
Anatol Yusef, English stage, film and television actor
 July 21
Justin Bartha, American actor
Josh Hartnett, American actor
 July 22 – A. J. Cook, Canadian actress
 July 23 - Pearry Reginald Teo, Singaporean filmmaker (d. 2023)
 July 24 – Jeff Mauro, American actor, chef
 August 2 – Natashia Williams, American actress, model
 August 3 
Tommy Dewey, American actor, producer, writer
Shanelle Workman, American actress, voice actress, producer and director
 August 4 – Mick Cain, American actor
 August 6 – Lee Ji-ah, South Korean actress
 August 8 – Countess Vaughn, American actress
 August 10 – Leo Fitzpatrick, American actor
 August 18 – Andy Samberg, American actor, comedian
 August 19 - Michelle Borth, American actress
 August 20 – Kris Smith, English Australian model, television presenter and rugby league footballer
 August 22 – James Corden, English singer, actor, television host
 August 23 – Andrew Rannells, American actor, voice actor, singer
 August 24 – Beth Riesgraf, American actress
 August 25 – Kel Mitchell, American actor, comedian
 August 28 – Sam Wills, New Zealand prop comic, busker, clown, and mime
 August 30 – Gianpaolo Venuta, Canadian actor
 August 31 – Mike Erwin, American actor
 September 3 – Nick Wechsler, Amer(ican actor
 September 4 – Wes Bentley, American actor
 September 7 – Devon Sawa, Canadian actor
 September 12 – Benjamin McKenzie, American actor
 September 16 - Ebonie Smith, American former actress and model
 September 18 – Billy Eichner, American comedian, actor, writer, and television personality
 September 20 – Charlie Weber, American actor
 September 21 – Paulo Costanzo, Canadian actor
 September 22 – Daniella Alonso, American actress and fashion model
 September 23 – Anthony Mackie, American actor
 September 24 - Christopher Nowinski, American author, co-founder and executive director of the Concussion Legacy Foundation; as well as a former professional wrestler with World Wrestling Entertainment
 September 25 – Rossif Sutherland, Canadian actor
 September 28 – Lucas Bryant, Canadian actor
 September 29 – Nathan West, American actor
 September 30 - Stark Sands, American actor
 October 1 – Katie Aselton, American actress, film director and producer
 October 3
Christian Coulson, English actor
Shannyn Sossamon, American actress
 October 6 - Lindsey Pearlman, American actress (d. 2022)
 October 7 - Hattie Morahan, English actress
 October 9 – Randy Spelling, American actor
 October 10
Trevor Eyster, American actor
Edan Gross, American former child actor
 October 11
Wes Chatham, American actor
Trevor Donovan, American actor
 October 14 – Usher, American singer, actor
 October 15
Devon Gummersall, American actor
Matt Lutz, American actor
 October 16 – Kala Savage, American actress
 October 18 – Wesley Jonathan, American actor
 October 21
Will Estes, American actor
Michael McMillian, American actor
 October 26 – 
CM Punk, American mixed martial artist, comic book writer and retired professional wrestler
Anthony Carrino, American contractor, designer, developer and television personality
 October 27 – David Walton, American actor
 October 28
Gwendoline Christie, English actress and model
Justin Guarini, American singer and actor
 October 30 - Matthew Morrison, American singer, actor
 October 31 – Brian Hallisay, American actor
 November 1 – Mary Kate Schellhardt, American actress
 November 2
Oliver Chris, English actor
Whit Hertford, American theatre director, writer and actor
 November 7 - Will Gluck, American director, producer, screenwriter and composer
 November 8 – Keir O'Donnell, Australian-American actor
 November 9 – Sisqó, American singer, actor, songwriter
 November 10
David Paetkau, Canadian actor
Diplo, American actor, DJ, record producer, rapper, songwriter
 November 12 - Nicolas Giraud, French actor and filmmaker
 November 17
Nonso Anozie, British actor
Zoe Bell, New Zealand stuntwoman, actress
Tom Ellis, Welsh actor
Rachel McAdams, Canadian actress
 November 19 – Eric Nenninger, American actor
 November 20 - Nadine Velazquez, American actress and model
 November 21 – Yasmine Al Massri, International actress, dancer, video artist and human rights advocate
 November 23 – Kayvan Novak, British actor, voice actor, and comedian
 November 24 – Katherine Heigl, American actress
 November 26 – Jun Fukuyama, Japanese voice actor and singer
 November 28 – Jodie Resther, Canadian actress
 November 29 – Lauren German, actress
 November 30 – Gael García Bernal, Mexican film actor, director, and producer
 December 1 – Stefan Kapičić, Serbian actor
 December 7
Shiri Appleby, American actress
Kristofer Hivju, Norwegian film actor, producer and writer
 December 8 – Ian Somerhalder, American actor
 December 9 – Jesse Metcalfe, American actor
 December 10 - Summer Phoenix, American actress
 December 12 - Gbenga Akinnagbe, American actor and writer
 December 13 – Cameron Douglas, American actor
 December 15 – Will Wikle, American actor and reality television personality
 December 16 – Joe Absolom, English actor
 December 17 – Douglas Tait, American actor, stuntman, filmmaker
 December 18
Josh Dallas, American actor
Katie Holmes, American actress
Ravi Patel (actor), American actor
 December 21 
Charles Dera, American pornographic actor, dancer, model, martial artist, and former U.S. Marine
Mike Vitar, American actor
 December 22 – Mia Tyler, American actress, model, author, visual artist, media personality, socialite, fashion designer, talent manager and music promoter
 December 23 - Josh Cowdery, American actor
 December 24 – Carlson Twins, American actors, models
 December 25 – Jeremy Strong, American film, television, and stage actor
 December 27 - Lisa Jakub, Canadian writer and former actress
 December 28 – John Legend, American composer and actor
 December 30 – Tyrese Gibson, American actor, singer, model
 December 31 – Johnny Sins, pornographic actor, director, and Internet personality

Deaths

Film debuts
Joan Allen – A Wedding
Karen Allen – National Lampoon's Animal House
Pedro Almodóvar (director) – Folle...folle...fólleme Tim!
María Conchita Alonso – Savana – Sesso e diamanti
Tomas Arana – Blood Feud
Kevin Bacon – National Lampoon's Animal House
Jonathan Banks – Coming Home
Frances Bay – Foul Play
Jim Belushi – The Fury
John Belushi - National Lampoon's Animal House
Jake Busey – Straight Time
Cheech & Chong – Up in Smoke
Billy Connolly – Absolution
Billy Crystal – Rabbit Test
Jamie Lee Curtis – Halloween
Eddie Deezen – Laserblast
R. Lee Ermey – The Boys in Company C
Corey Feldman – Born Again
Tovah Feldshuh – Nunzio
William Forsythe – Long Shot
Dennis Franz – The Fury
Joe Grifasi – The Deer Hunter  
Harry Hamlin – Movie Movie
Daryl Hannah – The Fury
Mark Harmon – Comes a Horseman
Ed Harris – Coma
Phil Hartman – Stunt Rock
Mary Beth Hurt – Interiors
Michael Keaton – Rabbit Test
John Malkovich – A Wedding
Laurie Metcalf – A Wedding
Liam Neeson – Pilgrim's Progress
Michael O'Keefe – Gray Lady Down
Mandy Patinkin – The Big Fix
Roddy Piper – The One and Only
Tony Plana – The Boss’s Son
Annie Potts – Corvette Summer
David Rasche – An Unmarried Woman
Christopher Reeve – Gray Lady Down
James Remar – On the Yard
Eric Roberts – King of the Gypsies
Tony Rosato – The Silent Partner
Gary Sinise – A Wedding
James Spader – Team-Mates
Mary Steenburgen – Goin' South
Peter Stormare – The Score
George Wendt – A Wedding
Alfre Woodard – Remember My Name
Grace Zabriskie – They Went That-A-Way & That-A-Way
Robert Zemeckis (director) – I Wanna Hold Your Hand

References

 
Film by year